James Ross (May 20, 1926 – January 1, 2016) was a Scottish-born Canadian professional ice hockey player who played 62 games in the National Hockey League with the New York Rangers during the 1951–52 and 1952–53 seasons. He was born in Edinburgh, Scotland, and raised in Toronto, Ontario. He died in 2016.

Career statistics

Regular season and playoffs

See also
 List of National Hockey League players from the United Kingdom

References

External links
 

1926 births
2016 deaths
Cincinnati Mohawks (AHL) players
Detroit Metal Mouldings players
New York Rangers players
Quebec Aces (QSHL) players
Saskatoon Quakers players
Scottish emigrants to Canada
Sportspeople from Edinburgh